Fantastica Mania 2014 was a series of five professional wrestling events co-produced by Japanese promotion New Japan Pro-Wrestling (NJPW) and Mexican promotion Consejo Mundial de Lucha Libre (CMLL) taking place between January 15 and 19, 2014. 2014 was the fourth year in which NJPW and CMLL come together to produce Fantastica Mania events, but the first time they held five events in one year, compared to two events in 2011 and 2012 and three in 2013. 2014 also marked the first time Fantasticamania events were held outside of Tokyo's Korakuen Hall, with the January 14 taking place in Osaka, Osaka at the Bodymaker Colosseum, the January 15 event in Kyoto, Kyoto at the KBS Hall and the January 17 event in Tokyo's Shin-Kiba 1st Ring, while the January 18 and 19 events were still held in Korakuen Hall. 2014 marked the first time some of the Fantastica Mania events were broadcast on pay-per-view (PPV).

Background
The events featured five to seven professional wrestling matches on each event with different wrestlers involved in pre-existing scripted feuds or storylines. Wrestlers portray either villains (referred to as heels in general or rudos in Mexico) or fan favorites (faces or técnicos in Mexico) as they compete in wrestling matches with pre-determined outcomes.

Following the success of Fantastica Mania 2013, then New Japan Pro-Wrestling (NJPW) president Naoki Sugabayashi announced that in 2014 he would like to take the event outside of Tokyo, naming Osaka and Nagoya as possible candidates. Fantastica Mania 2014 was officially announced on October 25, 2013, during the first day of NJPW's "Road to Power Struggle" tour, with events scheduled to take place in Osaka, Kyoto and Tokyo. On October 31, NJPW announced that the January 17 Shin-Kiba 1st Ring event would feature only CMLL luchadores, which would have made it the first Fantastica Mania event to not feature any NJPW wrestlers. NJPW wrestlers Taichi and Taka Michinoku were, however, later announced for the event. On November 7, NJPW announced the sixteen CMLL wrestlers taking part in the tour. A promotional poster released for the tour advertised NJPW wrestlers Bushi, Hiroshi Tanahashi, Jyushin Thunder Liger and Shinsuke Nakamura as taking part in the tour. The cards for all five events were released on January 6, 2014. On January 10, NJPW announced that the January 14 and 18 events would be broadcast live on pay-per-view (PPV) in Japan and internationally on internet pay-per-view (iPPV) through Niconico and Ustream, making them the first Fantastica Mania events available on PPV. On January 16, the tour ending January 19 event was also announced as a PPV.

Results

January 14

January 15

January 17

January 18

January 19

See also
2014 in professional wrestling

References

2014 in Japan
2014 in Tokyo
2014 in professional wrestling
2014
January 2014 events in Japan